Chusquea falcata is a species of bamboo endemic to Ecuador.

References

falcata
Endemic flora of Ecuador
Grasses of South America
Vulnerable flora of South America
Taxonomy articles created by Polbot